Benjamin Matthew Glassberg-Frost ( is a British conductor.  He is currently Music Director of Opera de Rouen Normandie, Principal Conductor of Glyndebourne on Tour, and Associate Guest Conductor of Orchestre National de Lyon. Glassberg attended Mill Hill School and after completing a Music Degree at the University of Cambridge, he studied conducting with Sian Edwards at the Royal Academy of Music in London. In 2017, aged 23, he won the Grand Prix at the 55th International Besançon Competition for Young Conductors.

Discography 

 Tempéraments, with piano soloist Shani Diluka and Orchestre de chambre de Paris (Mirare, 2019).
 Aranjuez, with Guitar soloist Thibaut Garcia and Orchestre national du Capitole de Toulouse (Erato / Warner Classics, 2020).

References 

British conductors (music)
People educated at Mill Hill School
1994 births
Living people